The Roman Catholic Archdiocese of Cartagena is an archdiocese located in the city of Cartagena in Colombia.

History
 24 April 1534: Established as Diocese of Cartagena from the Diocese of Panamá 
 20 June 1900: Promoted as Metropolitan Archdiocese of Cartagena

Bishops

Ordinaries

Diocese of Cartagena
Erected: April 24, 1534

Archdiocese of Cartagena
Elevated June 20, 1900
Pedro Adán (Pietro-Adamo) Brioschi, P.I.M.E. (1898 – 13 Nov 1943 Died)
José Ignacio López Umaña (1943–1974 Died)
Rubén Isaza Restrepo (1974–1983 Retired)
Carlos José Ruiseco Vieira (1983–2005 Resigned)
Jorge Enrique Jiménez Carvajal, C.I.M. (2005–2021 Retired)
Francisco Javier Múnera Correa, I.M.C. (2021–present)

Coadjutor archbishops
José Ignacio López Umaña (1942–1943)
Rubén Isaza Restrepo (1967–1974)
Jorge Enrique Jiménez Carvajal, C.I.M. (2004–2005)

Auxiliary bishops
Tulio Botero Salazar, C.M. (1949–1952), appointed Bishop of Zipaquirá
Rubén Isaza Restrepo (1952–1956), appointed Bishop of Montería (later returned here as Coadjutor and Archbishop)
Germán Villa Gaviria, C.I.M. (1956–1959), appointed Bishop of Barranquilla
Alfonso Uribe Jaramillo (1963–1968), appointed Bishop of Sonsón-Rionegro
Félix María Torres Parra (1966–1967), appointed Coadjutor Bishop of Santa Rosa de Osos
Ismael Rueda Sierra (2000–2003), appointed Bishop of Socorro y San Gil

Other priests of this diocese who became bishops
José Soleibe Arbeláez, appointed Auxiliary Bishop of Cali in 1999
Ariel Lascarro Tapia, appointed Bishop of Magangué in  2014

Suffragan dioceses
 Magangué 
 Montelíbano
 Montería
 Sincelejo

See also
Roman Catholicism in Colombia

References

External links
 Archdiocese of Cartagena 
 Catholic Hierarchy
 GCatholic.org

Roman Catholic dioceses in Colombia
Roman Catholic Ecclesiastical Province of Cartagena
1534 establishments in the Spanish Empire
Religious organizations established in the 1530s
Roman Catholic dioceses established in the 16th century